Stacy and Witbeck is a construction firm operating in the United States.
It has received contracts to build several rapid transit lines.

In 2011, Engineering News-Record reported the firm was the 103rd largest construction firm in the United States, and had $450 million in annual revenue.

In 2007 the firm received a contract to construct commuter rail stations in Wilsonville, Oregon.
In 2013 the firm received the contract to construct Detroit's M1 streetcar route.

References

Construction and civil engineering companies of the United States